Raschke may refer to:
 Carl Raschke, American philosopher
 Baron von Raschke, retired professional wrestler 
 Kimmey Raschke, Puerto Rican politician
 Jorge Raschke, Puerto Rican Pentecostal pastor 
 Kimmie Raschke, the daughter of Rev. Jorge Raschke 
 Maria Raschke, (1850–1935) lawyer in German women's movement
 Paula J. Raschke-Lind, American politician
 Philippe Raschke, French professional football defender
 Ulf Raschke, German football player
 Linda Bradford Raschke, commodities and futures trader and President of LBRGroup, Inc.
German-language surnames

Surnames from nicknames